CRH plc is an international group of diversified building materials businesses whose headquarters is in Dublin, Ireland. It manufactures and supplies a wide range of products for the construction industry. The group was formed through a 1970 merger of two leading Irish public companies, Cement Limited (established in 1936) and Roadstone Limited (1949). CRH's primary listings are on the London Stock Exchange (where it is a constituent of the FTSE 100 Index) and on Euronext Dublin (where it is a constituent of the ISEQ 20).

History

1970–1980s: formation and listings
The company's name is an abbreviation of Cement Roadstone Holdings, and was formed through the merger in 1970 of Cement Ltd (established in 1936) and  Roadstone Ltd (established in 1949). According to Jonathan Guthrie of the Financial Times, it is pronounced "Cee Orr Haitch". The company went public on the Irish Stock Exchange in 1973.

CRH entered the United States in 1978 by buying Amcor, a concrete products group in Utah which would then form the basis of the company's U.S. division, which is now called Oldcastle Inc. Subsequent large purchases in the US included Callanan Industries, a New York State based aggregates and asphalt producer in 1985. In 1987, CRH was listed as a constituent of the FTSE 100 Index.

1990s: early Europe and US acquisitions
In the 1990s the company moved into France with a number of buys including Raboni SA, a builders merchant company and drainage systems and concrete vault manufacturing group Prefaest SA.

In 1995, CRH made its first entry into new or emerging markets when it bought Holding Cement Polski, which later gained majority control of Cementownia Ozarow, one of the Poland's major cement producers. That acquisition marked the first CRH cement manufacturing operation outside Ireland. By the end of the decade, CRH numbered more than a dozen operations in Poland and it has since invested in cement production in neighbouring Ukraine, most recently with the announcement of an agreement to buy Mykolaiv Cement from rival Lafarge. In 1999 CRH bought Finnsementti Oy, Finland's only cement producer, and Lohja Rudus Oy, Finland's top producer of aggregates and ready-mix concrete.
 
In the 1990s, US acquisitions by CRH included Betco Block & Products Inc. of Bethesda, Maryland in 1990. CRH acquired Balf Co. in Connecticut, Lebanon Rock in Pennsylvania, Keating in Massachusetts and Sullivan Lafarge in New York state in 1994. It acquired Allied Building Products, which specialized in roofing and cladding products and Tilcon, a major road construction specialist in the Northeast United States in 1996.

2000–2010: later acquisitions

The company entered Switzerland in 2000 with the EUR 425 million purchase of Jura Group, adding cement, concrete and aggregates operations, as well as a regional distribution network. In the following year, CRH took an interest in Nesher Israel Cement Works, the only cement producer in that country, by taking a 25% stake in its holding company Mashav. In July 2003 it agreed to pay EUR 693 million to acquire Cementbouw - a do-it-yourself store chain and building materials producer in the Netherlands. In 2004 CRH paid €429m to purchase a 49 percent stake in Portuguese cement producer Secil. It sold that stake again in 2012 for €574m following a ruling on a shareholder dispute by an arbitration tribunal at the Paris-based International Chamber of Commerce.
 
In the United States, CRH acquired Ohio's Shelly Group in 2000, and CRH acquired Mount Hope Rock Products, based in New Jersey in 2002 and Ashland Paving And Construction (APAC) of Atlanta in 2006. APAC was the company's largest deal. In 2007 CRH purchased four companies worth a total of $350 million (€251 million) to add to its US materials division: these companies are Conrad Yelvington Distributors Inc. (CYDI), Eugene Sand & Gravel, Cessford Construction and McMinn's Asphalt and Prospect Agrregates. Also in 2008, CRH agreed to purchase a landscape paver, Pavestone, for $540 million.

In 2006 CRH invested in a cement factory based in the Heilongjiang region in China. It has built on that presence acquiring a 26% stake in the Jilin Yatai Group and an option to acquire 49% in the future. In 2008 CRH agreed to buy a 50 percent stake in Indian cement company My Home Industries Ltd. for €290 million ($452 million).

2011–2019: Americas, Europe and emerging markets

CRH confirmed in 2013 that it was interested in looking at other opportunities in India. In 2015, CRH remained listed in both London and Dublin. In February 2015, CRH agreed to purchase the UK building materials producer Lafarge Tarmac. In 2015, CRH purchased US$6.5 billion of assets from the newly formed company LafargeHolcim. The acquisition almost tripled CRH's net debt, bringing it to €6.6 billion. The LafargeHolcim acquisition made CRH "the world’s third-largest building materials group by market value." A week after CEO Albert Manifold announced that CRH was looking for large-scale acquisitions, in August 2015, CRH paid $1.3 billion for CR Laurence, a glazing company based in California. At the time, CRH already had a similar business in North America called BuildingEnvelope, with 4,500 employees, which it said it would integrate with CRH. By November 2015, CRH was getting about a fifth of its operating earnings from US infrastructure.

In June 2016, the Financial Times reported that CRH earned twice as much profit from the Americas versus Europe. As of November 2016, half the asphalt, aggregates and assorted material it sold went to the United States. Headquartered in Dublin, CRH was the biggest producer of asphalt in the US and the third largest producer of ready-mixed concrete. Sales for 2016 were €27.1 billion, an increase of 15 percent from the year before. Profit after tax was €1.3 billion. In April 2017, the Irish Times noted that chief executive Albert Manifold's package almost doubled in 2016 to €10 million, despite disagreement among shareholders the year before on pay. As of 27 April 2017, CRH was Ireland's biggest company. Chief executive was Albert Manifold. That quarter, sales were up in its three divisions in Europe, while the Americas materials unit had higher sales as well. At the time, it did 65 percent of its business in the Americas, while the market in the Philippines proving to be "challenging," and weighing down performance in Asia. On 27 April 2017, CRH held their annual general meeting in Dublin, at which point 17 percent of shareholders voted against the company's executive pay structure. The year prior, 40 percent had voted against. At the meeting, chairman Nick Hartery noted that share price in the company had increased 80 percent since 2014. Also in April 2017, it was reported that CRH was expecting to make a large-scale acquisition in 2018. At the time, over the earlier part of the year CRH had spent €500 million on eight acquisitions. In early May 2017, BlackRock increased its stake in CRH plc. Also in 2017, CRH sold Allied Building Products to Beacon Roofing Supply for $2.6 billion.

In 2018, CRH purchased Ash Grove Cement.

In July 2019, CRH announced that it was selling its European distribution arm to Blackstone, a US investment firm, for €1.64 billion.

Products
The company's products are as follows:

Governance and operating structure

Headquarters and board
CRH is registered in Ireland and headquartered in Dublin, Ireland. It has a board of 11 members:

Two Directors are executives of the Group.
 Albert Manifold, Chief Executive (Ireland)
 Jim Mintern Group Finance Director (Ireland)

Each of the nine remaining sits as a Non-Executive Director.
 Nicky Hartery, Chairman (Ireland)
 Patrick Kennedy (Ireland)
 Heather Ann McSharry (Ireland)
 Gillian Platt (Canada)
 Lucinda Riches (UK)
 Henk Rottinghuis (Netherlands)
 Willian Teuber (US)
 Donald A. McGovern, Jr., Senior Independent Director (US)

Mark Towe (Chairman, CRH Americas) retired from the plc board on 31 December 2016.

Structure and divisions
CRH is structured into four activities:
Heavyside materials (including cement, aggregates, concrete)
Heavyside products (such as precast concrete products)
Lightside products (construction accessories, glass and glazing systems, fencing, among others)
Distribution (builders merchant chains)

The holding company for CRH's American operations is Oldcastle, Inc.

CRH's operating companies include:

Oldcastle APG
C.R. Laurence Co., Inc.
De Ruwbouw Groep (DRBG)
Calduran
Dycore
Heembeton 
Oldcastle BuildingEnvelope
Oldcastle Infrastructure
Tarmac
Irish Cement
Roadstone
Rudus
HALFEN
Ancon
Cementbouw
Bauking (sold to Blackstone)
BMN Bouwmaterialen
Raboni
Eqiom
Tilcon
The Shelly Company
Polbruk
Sigco
Ash Grove Cement Company

Financial performance
The following is a summary of financial data:

Controversy

Cartel accusations

Poland
In Poland in 2007, CRH was fined €530,000 by the Polish Competition and Consumer Protection Commission for interfering with evidence that Polish authorities were gathering for a price-fixing investigation. In 2009, Grupa Ożarów (in which CRH first invested in 1995) was fined €26 million for operating a price fixing cartel in Poland. The Polish Competition Regulator stated that seven companies, which accounted for almost 100 per cent of the market, had fixed minimum prices for grey cement and agreed on a market share for each operator. CRH has stated its belief that Ozarów operated an independent commercial policy in Poland and the fine was appealed.

Ireland
In Ireland in 1994, Irish Cement Limited, a wholly owned subsidiary of CRH, was determined by the European Commission to be part of price fixing and market sharing cartel across Europe which it said had illegally and artificially inflated the price of cement throughout the continent. A fine of over €3.5 million was levied. In Ireland in 1996, High Court proceedings were initiated against CRH, its subsidiaries and two competitors in which the plaintiffs accused CRH and the others of operating a cartel and employing an illegal and anti-competitive eviction strategy in order to put them out of business. In 2012, CRH applied successfully to have the claim dismissed on the basis of the "inordinate and inexcusable delay" in bringing forward any evidence in the case. That judgement was appealed to the Supreme Court in 2012. At the time of the appeal it emerged that the presiding judge in the proceedings had ownership of some shares in CRH and was forced to stand down. As of 2012, the Irish cement and concrete industry at large was under investigation by the Irish Competition Authority.

United States
In 2006, an antitrust lawsuit was filed in California against CRH subsidiary Oldcastle Precast and three AT&T affiliates. The defendants were alleged to have unreasonably restrained trade and conspired to monopolize telephone vaults for land-line connections. Plaintiffs challenged a contract requiring developers to purchase Oldcastle Precast product for properties served by AT&T infrastructure. They contended the arrangement led to Oldcastle Precast capturing northern California sales of precast electrical vaults, which were often placed concurrently with telephone structures. In 2010, an American Court of Appeal ruled that the plaintiff's counsel had failed to provide enough evidence to show that the defendants harmed competition in California and Nevada telephone vault markets.

In October 2009, a cement and concrete price fixing class action lawsuit was filed in Florida against Oldcastle Materials and others. The claim alleged that the defendants eliminated competition in the market for cement and concrete by charging artificially high prices from at least the period 2000 to 2009. The claim further alleged that the conspiracy was facilitated through in-personal meetings, telephone conversations and other communications. In 2008 the defendants announced uniform price increases for concrete and cement, bringing their prices to the same level at the same time, the lawsuit claimed. Then in September a number of defendant companies cut the price of concrete in an effort to lure customers away from independently owned concrete firms. The lawsuit stated that the practices alleged in the cement and concrete industry were clearly illegal. In 2012, the case was settled for undisclosed terms.

April 2014, "ridiculously dangerous" was the description applied to an Oldcastle Materials construction zone in Cleveland, Ohio in a wrongful death lawsuit regarding the death of Randy Roginski on 27 July 2010. The family of the deceased was awarded $19 million in compensation and the CRH-related Shelly Company was levied $20 million in punitive damages.

Other allegations

Poland
In 2005, a Polish businessman, Marek Dochnal, alleged to a Polish Parliamentary Inquiry that he had arranged a bribe of almost $1 million for CRH to a former minister for privatisation, Wieslaw Kaczmarek, in connection with the privatisation of a cement plant at Ozarow, in central Poland, in 1995. CRH, which now owns and operates the cement plant at Ozarow, said the allegations were "without foundation".

It was also revealed in 2005, that CRH contributed €125,000 to a charity founded by the wife of Poland's President, Jolanta Kwasniewska. Both CRH and the Polish first lady denied any sinister motive behind the transaction.

Ireland
In 2003, CRH was accused of making payments to Ireland's former Taoiseach Charles Haughey as details emerged of how Haughey received payments from various companies and businessmen in return for political favours.  In 1969, Roadstone Ltd (CRH) sold 80 acres of land to Haughey, the then Minister of Finance, for £120,000. In 1973, Haughey sold 17.5 acres of that land back to CRH for £140,000. Within four years, Haughey had made a net profit of £20,000 and 62.5 acres at CRH's expense. Charles Haughey was offered chairmanship of CRH in 1972.

Ansbacher Bank
The existence of illegal offshore accounts first emerged in 1997 during the McCracken Tribunal set up to investigate reports of secret payments to former Taoiseach (Irish Prime Minister) Charles Haughey and former cabinet minister Michael Lowry.

The bank was founded in the 1970s and was being run by Des Traynor who was chairman of CRH from 1989 to 1994 and who ran his bank during that period out of CRH's registered office in Dublin's Fitzwilliam Square where the company provided an office for its chairman. Traynor was also personal financier to Charles Haughey.

During the investigation it materialised that Justice Moriarty held approximately £500,000 in CRH shares and while that in his opinion precluded him from investigating certain matters concerning CRH he was not, he said, precluded from inquiring into banking activities conducted from Des Traynor's offices at Fitzwilliam Square. Criticism was laid upon those in charge of appointing Moriarty given his shareholding.

In 1999, as evidence on the scale of the Ansbacher accounts grew Tánaiste (Irish Deputy Prime Minister) and PD Minister Mary Harney asked the High Court to appoint inspectors who could identify the account holders.

The High Court Inspectors' report was published in 2002. It found that eight out of fifteen CRH directors held Ansbacher accounts, including four former Chairmen. It also concluded (Chapter 15, p. 189) that "CRH as a corporation cannot be said to have knowingly assisted in the carrying out of Ansbacher’s activities in Ireland".

After the publication of the report CRH acknowledged publicly that its then Chairman had "misused its facilities and personnel" which "represented a grave breach of trust by Mr Traynor".

Sale of Glen Ding Lands
In 1998, Dáil Éireann (Ireland's Parliament) voted against an investigation into why an asset with the potential to produce a yield of £48 million in terms of sand and gravel reserves was sold to Roadstone, a subsidiary company of CRH, without public tender for £1.25 million in 1991.

Many opposition members of parliament voiced concerns that at the time of sale, Charles Haughey was Taoiseach and his financier Des Traynor was Chairman of CRH. Dáil Éireann voted not to investigate whether CRH had donated funds to any political party or politician before or after the purchase of Glen Ding.

The State's Comptroller and Auditor General conducted an investigation into the sale and found that the competing bid fell "far short of" the Roadstone offer and that "The Department acted at all times in the best commercial interests of the State" (Section 9.6). It also noted "even though it is unlikely that the Roadstone offer would have been bettered. The attraction of concluding the sale at what was considered a good price outweighed the imperative to act evenhandedly which is a basic principle when the State is doing business". It was noted by the Department's Accounting Officer that the Roadstone offer "was more than 50% above the only alternative offer received", that another bidder "was afforded every opportunity" to make a better offer and that given subsequent delays and planning issues. "In retrospect the deal had proved to be exceptional".

The Glen Ding transaction was further investigated by the Moriarty Tribunal which in 2006 reported its conclusion "that there was no connection, directly or indirectly, between Mr Charles Haughey and any aspect of this disposal, nor any connection between the operation of the Ansbacher accounts and any aspect of the disposal."

Public criticism
In 2005, opposition TD (Teachta Dála - Irish member of parliament) Phil Hogan, who later became Minister for Environment (2011 - ), stated in Dáil Éireann that "there is a widespread problem with competition in this economy... In the case of CRH, profits have been extracted from the Irish economy by means of a complex industry structure that is both anti-competitive and anti-consumer. The European Court of First Instance and finally the European Court of Justice have upheld findings of serious anti-competitive behaviour against CRH and other. While Sweden, Finland, UK, France and Germany have since levied huge fines against the cement industry, Ireland’s answer has been a stony silence."

In 2011 TD Shane Ross, a repeated critic of CRH as a journalist stated that CRH "disturbs" him and questioned why there had been no investigation of CRH in Ireland considering the adverse findings made against the company elsewhere.

References

External links
Official website

Companies listed on Euronext Dublin
Companies listed on the London Stock Exchange
Companies in the Euro Stoxx 50
Cement companies of the Republic of Ireland
Manufacturing companies based in Dublin (city)
Manufacturing companies established in 1970
Multinational companies headquartered in the Republic of Ireland
Irish brands
Irish companies established in 1970